Josef (Yosef) Burg may refer to:
Josef Burg (writer) (1912–2009), Ukrainian Yiddish writer
Yosef Burg (1909–1999), Israeli politician